Philip Bennett is an American journalist and professor of journalism and public policy at Duke University.  Bennett began his career at  The Lima Times in Peru before joining the staffs of The Boston Globe (1984–1997) and The Washington Post (1997–2009). He was managing editor at The Post from 2005 to 2009, a period during which the newspaper won 10 Pulitzer Prizes.  He was previously deputy national editor of national security, defense and foreign policy coverage, and assistant managing editor for foreign news at The Post.  At The Boston Globe, he was a foreign correspondent, metropolitan reporter, assistant editor of Metro news, and finally foreign editor. Currently, he is the Eugene C. Patterson Professor and director of the DeWitt Wallace Center for Media and Democracy at Duke University's Sanford School of Public Policy.

Early life and family 

A native of the San Francisco area, Bennett is a Harvard University graduate who describes his outlook this way: "I love newspapers and the people who make them."  He has been described by other journalists as “a low-key man with a studious air.”  He met his wife, who is now a professor of Latin American literature at Georgetown University, in Peru.

Academia 

According to POLITICO, in 2008, "Bennett was up for the Post's executive editor job before the top spot went to Marcus Brauchli. However, Bennett remained for several months in the number two position to smooth the transition, before eventually stepping down in January."  After stepping down, Bennett was on the short list for J-School dean at UC Berkeley before being appointed Eugene C. Patterson Professor of Journalism and Public Policy at Duke University in 2009.

Reacting to his appointment, Bennett said in a statement: "Now that the news media face unprecedented trials and possibilities, Duke is an ideal place to explore journalism’s next frontier, especially journalism that serves the public interest. I’m thrilled by the opportunity to do this as part of the Duke faculty."
According to Duke University, "The Patterson Chair is named in honor of the former editor-in-chief and chief executive officer of The St. Petersburg Times, whose earlier work as editor of the Atlanta Constitution set a benchmark for coverage of the civil rights movement. Patterson also served three years as managing editor at The Washington Post and taught for a year at Duke. [...] The chair, endowed by a gift from the Poynter Fund, has been occupied since 1998 by former Time magazine writer and editor Susan Tifft, who is stepping down at the end of this academic year." In 2013 he was named director of the DeWitt Wallace Center for Media and Democracy at Duke University, a position he will hold until the end of his two-year appointment on July 1, 2015.  Speaking about his plans in this new role, Bennett said: “One leading challenge for journalists is to make sense of an expanding universe of available data and to put it in the service of more accurate and thorough reporting, and rich storytelling, [...] Universities can help experiment and create in ways that have become more difficult for the news industry.”  Bennett works closely with Bill Adair, the Knight Chair for Computational Journalism at Duke University, who was appointed in 2013.

Controversy 

Bennett has received some criticism for a 2008 speech titled "Covering Islam: a Challenge for American Journalism", delivered at the University of California at Irvine, where Bennett was the Chancellor's Distinguished Fellow Lecturer, Bennett said, “At the Post I want more Muslim readers and I want more Muslim journalists,” and  called on news organizations to hire more Muslim journalists so that Americans could be taught to understand “the basic tenets of Islam.” The speech was sponsored by  the Center for the Study of Democracy, School of Social Sciences, UC Irvine. In October 2008, Bennett gave a speech at Amherst College titled "The Presidential Race, What's the Story?"

References

External links

Year of birth missing (living people)
Living people
American newspaper editors
The Washington Post people
Duke University faculty
Harvard University alumni